Larkas is a surname. Notable people with the surname include:

Mikko Larkas (born 1981), Finnish basketball coach
Olavi Larkas (1913–1984), Finnish fencer and modern pentathlete
Veikko Larkas (1909–1969), Finnish architect

See also
Larka